The 2022 Caribbean Series marked the 64th edition of the Caribbean Series  from January 28 through February 3, 2022, played at Estadio Quisqueya in Santo Domingo, Dominican Republic.

The series brought together the champions of each professional baseball league in the countries that make up the Caribbean Professional Baseball Confederation (Venezuela, the Dominican Republic, Puerto Rico, and Mexico), plus the representatives of Panama and Colombia as guests.

Stadium 
Estadio Quisqueya Juan Marichal in Santo Domingo hosted the preliminary rounds, the semifinals, and final matches.

Tournament format 
A single round-robin format was used; each team faced each other once. The four teams with the best records advanced to the semifinals (1st vs. 4th and 2nd vs. 3rd), and the two winners met in the final to decide the tournament champion.

Participating teams

Preliminary round

Time zone: Atlantic Standard Time (UTC–4)

Knockout stage

Semi-finals

Final

Awards

References

External links 

 Official website (Spanish)

2022
Caribbean Series
Caribbean Series
International baseball competitions hosted by the Dominican Republic
Caribbean Series
Caribbean Series
Sports competitions in Santo Domingo
21st century in Santo Domingo